The 2020 season was the New York Giants' 96th in the National Football League (NFL) and their first under head coach Joe Judge.

For the first time since 2003, long-time quarterback Eli Manning was not on the roster, as he announced his retirement on January 22. Manning led the Giants to six playoff appearances, three NFC East titles, and two Super Bowl wins in the 2007 and 2011 seasons, winning the game MVP title in both Super Bowls.

Despite starting the season 0–5 for the third time in eight years, the Giants improved on their 4–12 record from the previous season with their week 13 upset win over the Seattle Seahawks and rallied to finish 6–10, but despite beating their divisional rival, the Dallas Cowboys, the Giants failed to win the NFC East or make the playoffs for the fourth consecutive year, following the Washington Football Team winning their final game against the Philadelphia Eagles in Week 17. The Giants would have needed the Eagles to win in order to win the NFC East due to their head-to-head record against Washington, and it would have made them the first team in the Super Bowl era to make the playoffs with a double-digit losing record.

On July 20, 2020 the Giants confirmed that their home games would take place without fans in attendance due to the ongoing COVID-19 pandemic in the United States.

Offseason

Signings

Draft

Pre-draft trades
  On October 23, 2018, the Giants traded cornerback Eli Apple to the New Orleans Saints for a fourth-round pick in the 2019 draft and a seventh-round pick in the 2020 draft.
  On October 29, 2019, the Giants traded their third-round pick in the 2020 draft and a fifth-round pick in the 2021 draft to the New York Jets in exchange for defensive end Leonard Williams.

Undrafted free agents

Staff

Final roster

Preseason
The Giants' preseason schedule was announced on May 1.

Regular season

Schedule
The Giants' 2020 schedule was announced on May 7.

Note: Intra-division opponents are in bold text.

Game summaries

Week 1: vs. Pittsburgh Steelers

The Giants lost their first game in the post-Eli Manning era. They suffered their 4th consecutive loss in a season opener, and became 3–8 in home openers since moving to MetLife Stadium.

The Giants opened up strong, taking a 10-3 lead on the first play of the 2nd quarter when Daniel Jones connected with Darius Slayton for a 41-yard score. T. J. Watt forced an interception of Jones which sparked two Steelers touchdown drives before halftime. In the 3rd quarter, on the 19th play of an 87-yard drive, Jones was hit by Bud Dupree and forced a goal-line interception, which the Steelers kicked a field goal to make it a 2 possession game. JuJu Smith-Schuster scored his second touchdown in the 4th quarter for the Steelers to take a commanding 26-10 lead. Slayton scored his second touchdown with 1:52 remaining, but the Steelers sealed the victory when they stopped the Giants 2-point conversion attempt and recovered the onside kick.

Week 2: at Chicago Bears

The Giants came out flat, surrendering a 12 play, 82-yard opening touchdown drive that lasted half the first quarter. Saquon Barkley suffered a season ending ACL injury on the first play of the second quarter, and Daniel Jones later threw a costly red zone interception to end the drive. They would also lose Sterling Shepard to a toe injury.

Down 17-0, the Giants tightened up their defensive play in the second half, forcing two interceptions from Bears quarterback Mitchell Trubisky and getting back in the game. In the final 2:02 down 17-13, Daniel Jones tried to complete a comeback and led the offense to the Bears' 10-yard line, but could not score, so the Giants started 0–2 for the 4th consecutive year.

Week 3: vs. San Francisco 49ers

With the loss, the Giants fell to 0–3 for the first time since 2017. The 49ers did not punt once the entire game while the Giants only mustered 231 total yards. Daniel Jones had multiple turnovers for the third game in a row.

Week 4: at Los Angeles Rams

Daniel Jones tried to mount a game-tying drive but threw an interception in Rams territory to seal the loss. It was his 7th turnover in 4 games. The Giants fell to 0–4 for the first time since 2017 and failed to score a touchdown for the second consecutive game.

Week 5: at Dallas Cowboys

The Giants blew a 14-point lead in the second quarter. Daniel Jones' fumbling woes continued after he was sacked by Cowboys' Anthony Brown who returned that same fumble for a touchdown. The Giants briefly regained the lead with 8:46 left in the 4th quarter after Cowboys quarterback Dak Prescott suffered a season-ending ankle injury, but their defense could not hang on against backup quarterback Andy Dalton. The Cowboys kicked a game-winning field goal to drop the still-winless Giants to 0–5 and two games behind the 2–3 Cowboys.

Week 6: vs. Washington Football Team

Tae Crowder, the last pick in the 2020 NFL Draft, recovered a fumble and ran 43 yards for the go-ahead score with 3:29 remaining. After responding with a touchdown to make it 20–19, Washington coach Ron Rivera chose to go for the 2-point conversion, and the win. The Giants stopped Washington's conversion attempt, guaranteeing Joe Judge his first win as an NFL head coach.

Week 7: at Philadelphia Eagles

After a slow start in the first half, the Giants gained momentum to take a 21–10 fourth-quarter lead. However, several mishaps would ensue for New York, including late penalties and a critical drop by Evan Engram in the 4th quarter at the Eagles 25 yard line. Philadelphia capitalized on the momentum swing and scored two unanswered touchdowns for a 22–21 lead with 40 seconds left in regulation. With one last chance to drive for a potential game-winning field goal, Daniel Jones was strip-sacked by Brandon Graham on second down. The Eagles recovered the loose ball, sealing New York's fate. The heartbreaking loss dropped the Giants to 1–6 on the season and extended their losing streak against the Eagles to eight games dating back to Week 9 of the 2016 season.

Week 8: vs. Tampa Bay Buccaneers

Despite leading 17–15 heading into the fourth quarter, more miscues haunted the Giants as the defense allowed Tom Brady to score 10 points and quickly fell behind 25–17. Despite the miscues, the Giants drove down the field with Daniel Jones finding Golden Tate in the endzone with 28 seconds left. However, during the two-point conversion, controversy arose after the referees picked up a flag for an Antoine Winfield Jr. pass interference on Dion Lewis in the endzone as Winfield made a deflection on a Daniel Jones pass. This forced the Giants to attempt an onside kick and could not recover the kick ending the game. The Giants dropped 1–7 for the third time in four seasons.

Week 9: at Washington Football Team

The Giants took an early lead and never trailed. Washington fought back from a 20-3 deficit and cut the lead to 23-20. However, two late interceptions allowed the Giants victory and swept Washington for the second straight year to improve to 2–7. The Giants had 5 total takeaways and did not turn the ball over for the first time in the season and extended their winning streak against Washington to 5 games. The Giants were the only NFC East team to defeat Washington in the 2020 season.

Week 10: vs. Philadelphia Eagles

With this win, the Giants avenged their Week 7 loss and improved to 3–7 on the season. The Giants did not turn the ball over for the second straight game and did not force any turnovers on defense. The victory also snapped an 8 game losing streak to the Eagles, dating back to Week 9 of the 2016 season. After the game, the Giants extended kicker Graham Gano $14M through the 2023 NFL season.

Week 12: at Cincinnati Bengals

The Giants opened up with a Wayne Gallman touchdown on 4th and Goal, set up by a 53-yard completion from Jones to Evan Engram. The Bengals returned the ensuing kickoff for a touchdown of their own and the halftime score was 10-10. The Giants defense forced three turnovers in the 2nd half, the first an interception by Niko Lalos, a rookie from Dartmouth making his NFL debut, and a forced fumble later by Logan Ryan which he also recovered. The Bengals cut into the Giants 19-10 lead in the final minutes and had a chance to win the game on the final drive, but backup quarterback Brandon Allen was sacked by Jabaal Sheard and lost the ball, which was recovered by the Giants. Daniel Jones injured his hamstring in the win.

With the win, the Giants became the third NFL team to win 700 regular season games (only behind the Bears and Packers) and won in Cincinnati for the first time in franchise history.

Week 13: at Seattle Seahawks

The Giants did not have Daniel Jones as their starting quarterback and were double-digit underdogs going into a cross-country battle with the Seahawks. In only his second appearance with the team and first start, Colt McCoy and the Giants shocked the NFL with one of the biggest upsets of the 2020 season. McCoy won his first game as a starting quarterback since October 27, 2014, when he was with the Washington Redskins. The Giants defense contained Russell Wilson all game long, sacking him 5 times and forcing 2 takeaways. Seattle was leading 5–0 at halftime, but in the third quarter, the Giants' rushing attack broke through with a 60-yard run by Wayne Gallman which set up two Alfred Morris touchdowns on back-to-back possessions. With a 17–12 lead and under two minutes to play, the defense was able to stop Wilson one last time. With the upset win, the Giants improved to 5–7, beat the Seahawks for the first time since 2010, and earned their longest winning streak since 2016. In addition, New York would take sole possession of first place in the NFC East, though the Washington Football Team would move back into a first-place tie with the Giants the following night with a bigger upset win over the undefeated Pittsburgh Steelers.

Week 14: vs. Arizona Cardinals

The Giants average starting field position was from their own 17-yard line while the Cardinals' started from their own 47-yard line all game. The Giants struggled from start to finish in an uphill battle as Daniel Jones and the offense struggled to move the ball with only 4 first downs in the first half. The defense kept the game competitive as long as they could with an early goal line stand, but were overmatched in a 26-7 blowout loss. Cardinals LB Haason Reddick had a dominating performance with 5 sacks and 3 forced fumbles. The Giants snapped their four-game winning streak, dropped to 5-8 on the season, and lost Jones to another leg injury.  New York also dropped to second place in the NFC East when the Washington Football Team defeated the San Francisco 49ers later that afternoon to take sole possession of first place.

Week 15: vs. Cleveland Browns

Before Week 14, the NFL flexed the Giants-Browns game into the Sunday Night Football slot, replacing the San Francisco 49ers visiting the Dallas Cowboys. It was the first time the Giants have played on Sunday Night since the 2018 season.

The Giants did not have Daniel Jones due to his injury and also lost offensive coordinator Jason Garrett and defensive back James Bradberry who both contracted COVID-19. Former Browns draft pick Colt McCoy and former head coach Freddie Kitchens were promoted to starting QB and offensive coordinator, respectively. The Giants opened the game with great field position and drove into the red zone only to turn the ball over on downs on a fake field goal attempt. The defense forced a turnover on downs of their own and the Giants took advantage of the ensuing field position and led 3–0 after the first quarter. Baker Mayfield then got hot, leading the Browns on three 10+ play touchdown drives, two of them for 95 yards. The Giants offense struggled to gain that kind of momentum and the Browns won 20–6, dropping New York to 5–9 and losing to the Browns for the first time since 2008.

Week 16: at Baltimore Ravens

The Ravens scored on all 4 drives in the first half and all of them were 10+ plays. Daniel Jones made his third start in 5 weeks and could only muster 89 yards on 8 completions in the first half. A tired Giants defense couldn't keep up, and the Ravens became the first team since 2008 to have 3 players run for 75+ yards in the same game (Jackson, Dobbins, and Edwards).

In the loss, kicker Graham Gano tied a Giants franchise record with his 29th consecutive field goal.

Despite the loss, the Giants remained in playoff contention with Washington's loss to the Panthers, and the Eagles loss to the Cowboys.

Week 17: vs. Dallas Cowboys

Despite orchestrating 3 touchdown drives in his previous 3 starts, Daniel Jones and the Giants came out firing, scoring 3 touchdowns in the first half, including two from Sterling Shepard, one of which was a 23-yard end-around on the opening drive. However, the Cowboys scored a field goal on their last possession in the first half and a touchdown by Ezekiel Elliott on their first drive of the third quarter to make it a one-score game.

Kickers Greg Zuerlein and Graham Gano traded field goals in the 4th quarter, respectively, and the Cowboys needed a touchdown to take the lead. On the Cowboys last chance of the game. Leonard Williams sacked Andy Dalton on first and goal and got to him again on third down. Williams hit Dalton as he was throwing the ball, and the pass was intercepted by rookie safety Xavier McKinney, his first NFL interception. Needing a first down to run out the clock, running back Wayne Gallman got it then fumbled the ball without being touched, but the Giants recovered.

With the win, the Giants improved to 6–10 and eliminated the Cowboys. They also snapped a 7-game losing streak against the Dallas Cowboys, which dated back to Week 14 of the 2016 season. Their 6 wins was the most in a season since 2016 as well. They also won all three home games against their divisional opponents in a season for the first time since 2005. However, the Giants were eliminated when the Washington Football Team defeated the Philadelphia Eagles 20-14 and clinched the NFC East later that night.

Standings

Division

Conference

References

External links
 

New York Giants
New York Giants seasons
New York Giants season
21st century in East Rutherford, New Jersey
Meadowlands Sports Complex